The Dutch Reformed Church  in Harrodsburg, Kentucky, also known as Old Mud Meeting House, is a historic Reformed church.

It was built in 1800 and is an oak log building which was the first Low Dutch Reformed Church west of the Alleghenies. It was constructed of vertical logs with mud and straw panels in between. Weatherboard on the exterior and plastering on the interior was added in 1850 and later.

It was added to the National Register in 1973.

References

Churches on the National Register of Historic Places in Kentucky
Churches completed in 1800
Churches in Mercer County, Kentucky
National Register of Historic Places in Mercer County, Kentucky
Log buildings and structures on the National Register of Historic Places in Kentucky
Former Dutch Reformed churches in the United States
Harrodsburg, Kentucky
1800 establishments in Kentucky